KCYY (100.3 FM) is a commercial radio station in San Antonio, Texas.  It is owned by Cox Radio and airs a country music radio format.  Studios and offices are on Datapoint Drive in San Antonio.

KCYY has an effective radiated power (ERP) of 100,000 watts, the maximum for non-grandfathered FM stations.  The transmitter site is on the McCarter Ranch, off Galm Road in the Far West Side of San Antonio, near Government Canyon State Natural Area.

History

KBER-FM, KSAQ, KCCW
On June 25, 1966, the station signed on as KBER-FM.  It was owned by Kepo Broadcasting and was the FM counterpart of AM 1150 KBER (now AM 1160 KRDY).  Because KBER AM was a daytime-only station, its country music programming continued on KBER-FM into the night.

In 1974, KBER-AM-FM were sold to Pacific Western Broadcasting.  The call signs were changed to KQAM for the AM station and KSAQ for the FM station, also known as "Q-100."  The two simulcast a Top 40 format.  In 1976, the AM station was sold to a Spanish-language broadcaster, while the FM station was sold to Radio Alamo.  Radio Alamo switched the call letters to KZZY, initially keeping the Top 40 sound.  But then it briefly tried a country format as KCCW.  The country music lasted less than a year.

Klassy 100
In 1981, Radio Alamo flipped the format to adult contemporary music.  Radio Alamo also acquired AM 930 in Terrell Hills (now KLUP) and simulcast both stations, as KLLS and KLLS-FM, "Klassy 100 FM."

In 1987, Newcity Communications acquired AM 680 and FM 100.3.

Country KCYY
680 KKYX had been owned by Swanson Communications, running a classic country format.  So when it was paired with KLLS-FM, Newcity made the decision to also play country music on the FM, but a more contemporary version.  The call sign was changed to KCYY, with the CY standing for Country and the additional Y as the moniker of the station, "Y100."  San Antonio already had an FM country station that had been doing well in the ratings, 97.3 KAJA, owned by Clear Channel Communications, which also owned AM 1200 WOAI.  Another country station was 107.5 KBUC-FM, but its ratings weren't a factor, and it eventually flipped to Tejano KXTN-FM.

Newcity thought there were enough country fans in San Antonio for two healthy FM country outlets.  KCYY premiered by playing 10,000 songs in a row with no commercials.  Backed by the commercial-free weeks and TV ads, KCYY became San Antonio's top country station in Spring 1988.  KCYY was also the top station in the 18- to 49-year-old demographic and the 25-54 demographic, according to the Arbitron ratings.

Cox Radio acquired KCYY and KKYX in 1997.  Since the late 80s, Cox-owned 100.3 KCYY and iHeartMedia-owned 97.3 KAJA have see-sawed in the ratings, with both stations often in the top five in the San Antonio market.

References

External links

Country radio stations in the United States
CYY
Cox Media Group
Radio stations established in 1966